A. S. Embree, a former minister, was an experienced American union organizer and, briefly, a leader of the Industrial Workers of the World (IWW). Embree served as the secretary-treasurer pro tem of the national IWW for a period of two months after the national office was raided by federal agents.

Embree was the editor of the Nome Industrial Worker in Nome, Alaska and chairman of the Bisbee, Arizona IWW strike committee. He was among the union men deported during the Bisbee Deportation, July 12, 1917. He later returned to Bisbee, and was arrested on a charge of inciting a riot. After a change of venue, he was tried in Tucson, and acquitted minutes after testimony was completed. Embree then again returned to Bisbee, and was jailed for three months, and threatened with lynching if he did not leave for good.

Embree sought relief from the federal government, arguing that he had the right to live with his wife and children wherever he chose. The federal government informed him that they saw no grounds on which to intervene.

He then worked as an organizer in Butte, Montana, and then traveled to Idaho, where he was arrested for making speeches and distributing literature for the IWW. Embree was convicted of violating Idaho's Criminal Syndicalism Act in Shoshone County in 1921, and spent more than three years in jail. After he was released, he began organizing coal miners in Colorado in March 1926, focusing in particular on Walsenburg, Colorado. A subsequent strike resulted in a statewide walkout of twelve thousand miners. The strike is best known for the Columbine Mine Massacre.

In August 1939, Embree was working as an organizer for the International Union of Mine, Mill, and Smelter Workers (IUMMSW) in Silverton, Colorado. Embree and the secretary of the Silverton local were forced into an automobile and deported. The National Labor Relations Board stepped in and ordered back pay for miners who had also been evicted.

Footnotes

American miners
Colorado socialists
Idaho socialists
Industrial Workers of the World leaders
Montana socialists
Year of birth missing
Year of death missing